The 1965 World Archery Championships was the 23rd edition of the event. It was held in Västerås, Sweden on 20–23 July 1965 and was organised by World Archery Federation (FITA).

Medals summary

Recurve

Medals table

References

External links
 World Archery website
 Complete results

World Championship
World Archery
World Archery Championships
International archery competitions hosted by Sweden